Guilherand-Granges is a commune in the Ardèche department in southern France. It is a suburb of Valence, Drôme. It is one of the most populous commune in the Ardéche department, after Annonay and Aubenas, and before Tournon-sur-Rhône.

Population

See also
Communes of the Ardèche department

References

Communes of Ardèche
Ardèche communes articles needing translation from French Wikipedia